Ceroprepes naga is a species of snout moth in the genus Ceroprepes. It was described by Roesler and Küppers, in 1979, and is known from Sumatra and Japan.

References

Moths described in 1979
Phycitinae
Moths of Japan